David Leslie may refer to:

David Leslie, 1st Lord Newark (c. 1600–1682), Scottish general in the English Civil War
David Leslie, 3rd Earl of Leven (1660–1728), Scottish aristocrat, politician and soldier
David Leslie, 6th Earl of Leven (1722–1802)
David Leslie (Oregon politician) (1797–1869), American missionary and pioneer in what became the state of Oregon
David Leslie (rugby union) (born 1952), Scottish rugby union player
David Leslie (racing driver) (1953–2008), British racing driver
David Leslie (performance artist), American performance artist and stuntman